Jukebox Jury may refer to:
 Juke Box Jury, a British panel show
 Jukebox Jury (horse), a racehorse